Amphiscapha is a fossil gastropod mollusk, or less likely a monoplacophoran, genus from the  Pennsylvanian and Lower Permian of North and South America, included in the family Euomphalidae. It is sometimes regarded as a subgenus of Straparollus, S. (Amphiscapha) Knight 1942

Description 
The shell in this genus is hyper strophic discoidal, with a flat base and a concave upper side. The location of what is presumed to be the exhalent channel is marked by a smooth or rugose ridge along the upper-outer margin, which lies along the edge of a flat to concave outer rim.

References
J. B. Knight et al. 1960. Systematic descriptions; Treatise on Invertebrate Paleontology; Part I, Mollusca(1): I192.
Paleobiology database info on Amphiscapha

Euomphalidae
Pennsylvanian first appearances
Cisuralian genus extinctions
Carboniferous gastropods
Permian gastropods